Oreophryne minuta is a species of frog in the family Microhylidae. It is endemic to Papua, Western New Guinea, and only known from its type locality in the Derewo River basin, in the mountains to the southeast of Cenderawasih Bay. It is a very small frog (maximum size ), and at the time of species description, the smallest Oreophryne species.

Description
Adult males in the type series measure  in snout–vent length; females are unknown. The snout is bluntly pointed in dorsal view and bluntly rounded in lateral profile. The tympanum is indistinct. The fingers and the toes have no webbing. The tips have faint terminal grooves but are not expanded into discs. Skin is smooth. The dorsum has scattered low tubercles forming an hourglass pattern. There are two distinctly larger tubercles on the mid-dorsum behind eyes. Alcohol-preserved specimens are pale brown to brown and have a dark band running from the tip of the snout through the eye, becoming a patchy lateral band.

The male advertisement call consists of a series of distinctly pulsed, rapidly repeated notes lasting about 1–3 seconds and repeat at a rate of 6 s−1. The dominant frequency is about 6900–7500 Hz.

Habitat and conservation
The types were collected from an extremely wet, boulder-filled gully.

Threats to this species are unknown. It is not known to occur in any protected areas.

References

minuta
Amphibians of Western New Guinea
Endemic fauna of New Guinea
Endemic fauna of Indonesia
Amphibians described in 2000
Taxa named by Stephen J. Richards
Taxonomy articles created by Polbot